Tasmanophlebi lacuscoerulei is a species of mayfly in family Siphlonuridae. It is endemic to New South Wales in Australia. It is known commonly as the large Blue Lake mayfly.

This mayfly has a limited distribution in an area of about 80 square kilometers in Kosciuszko National Park. It occurs at Blue Lake and its inlet stream, and possibly at Lakes Albina and Cootapatamba.

The species is native to the alpine climate of this area, and is likely sensitive to climate change. For this reason it was uplisted from vulnerable to endangered status by the International Union for Conservation of Nature (IUCN) in 2014.

References

Mayflies
Insects of Australia
Fauna of New South Wales
Endangered fauna of Australia
Taxonomy articles created by Polbot